is a Japanese film producer who has produced eight films in his career since it began in 2011.

Life and career
Nishino was born in 1987 in Tokyo, Japan. During his childhood, he watched Ultraman via his mother recording a rebroadcast of the series on VHS. Nishino said that the series "sparked my interest in film". During his years at elementary school, Nishino's father hired Michael Bay's The Rock, which inspired him to enter the film industry. Shin Ultraman director Shinji Higuchi stated that Nishino wrote a "thesis in college on Tohl Narita, who originally designed Ultraman and the Kaiju of the original series."

In 2011, he began his career in film and television after joining Toho. That year, his first film as a producer, Paternal Womb, was released. Two years later, while working in advertising at Tokai and Hokuriku, he was transferred to the planning division of Toho and worked on the television series Hard Nuts!. He has since worked as a producer on Toho's My Tomorrow, Your Yesterday, Spark, Killing for the Prosecution, It Comes, Fortuna's Eye, Brave: Gunjyo Senki, and Shin Ultraman.

Filmography

Film

Television

Notes

References

External links

Japanese film producers
1987 births
Living people
People from Tokyo